The 1987 Western Michigan Broncos football team represented Western Michigan University in the Mid-American Conference (MAC) during the 1987 NCAA Division I-A football season.  In their first season under head coach Al Molde, the Broncos compiled a 5–6 record (4–4 against MAC opponents), finished in fifth place in the MAC, and were outscored by their opponents, 240 to 218.  The team played its home games at Waldo Stadium in Kalamazoo, Michigan.

The team's statistical leaders included Dave Kruse with 1,592 passing yards, Robert Davis with 477 rushing yards, and Jamie Hence with 858 receiving yards.

On December 17, 1986, Molde was named as Western's new head football coach. He had been head football coach at Eastern Illinois from 1983 to 1986 and led that team to an 11–2 record in 1986.

Schedule

References

Western Michigan
Western Michigan Broncos football seasons
Western Michigan Broncos football